Taban may refer to: 
In Persian
Aglow;agleam;brilliant;fulgent;shiner; hot;light;luminous

Geography
 Tabán, a district of Budapest
 Taban, Iran, a village in Khuzestan Province, Iran
 Taban, Libya
 Tabani, Briceni, Moldova, also called Taban'
 Tell Taban, an archaeological tell in Syria and the location of the ancient city of Tabetu
 Taban, Kayapınar

Other uses
 Taban Air, an Iranian airline
 Taban Shoresh, an Iraqi Kurd charity founder
 Alfred Taban, a Sudanese journalist
 Paride Taban, a Sudanese bishop
 Taban Lo Liyong, a Sudanese poet
 Taban (newspaper), an Iranian newspaper